Thomas Edward Toner (January 25, 1950August 26, 1990) was a professional American football player who played linebacker for four seasons for the Green Bay Packers.

References

1950 births
1990 deaths
People from Woburn, Massachusetts
Players of American football from Massachusetts
American football linebackers
Idaho State Bengals football players
Green Bay Packers players
Deaths from cancer in California
People from Solana Beach, California